"Come" is a single by Swedish singer-songwriter and former lead singer of the group Ace of Base, Jenny Berggren. It is an English cover of the Swedish song "Om" by Niklas Strömstedt and was performed for the first time at the sixth season of the Swedish TV show Så mycket bättre and later released on the compilation album Så Mycket Bättre (Säsong 6).

Charts

References

2015 singles
2015 songs
Songs written by Jenny Berggren